The Zliczans was a Slavic tribe in early medieval Bohemia, divided by a river from the tribe of the Bohemians. They are mentioned in the Chronicle of Dalimil. In the 9th and 10th centuries their seat was in Kouřim. They likely held the Vyšehrad castle in their frontier. They were overpowered by the Přemyslid dynasty on 28 September 995, when the ruling Slavník dynasty was massacred by the Přemyslids.

Dukes
Radslav of Kouřim (early 10th century) who led a war against Wenceslaus I, Duke of Bohemia
Slavník (d. 981)
Soběslav (late 10th century)

References

10th-century Bohemian people
West Slavic tribes